Church of the Saint Archangel Michael in Darda is a Serbian Orthodox church in eastern Croatia. The first orthodox church at the site of contemporary church was constructed in 1726, while the current building was completed in 1777. The local Eastern Orthodox parish in Darda was formally established in 1742. The church is a single-nave building with a semicircular apse and a bell tower on the first floor. The bell tower is covered with a late baroque bulb with two lanterns. It was consecrated by the Bishop of the Eparchy of Buda Dionisije Popović in 1794.

See also
Eparchy of Osječko polje and Baranja
Serbs of Croatia
List of Serbian Orthodox churches in Croatia

References

Darda
Churches completed in 1777
18th-century Serbian Orthodox church buildings